Antti Juutilainen (15 January 1882, Ruskeala - 18 July 1951) was a Finnish farmer and politician. He was a member of the Parliament of Finland from 1916 to 1930, representing the Agrarian League.

References

1882 births
1951 deaths
People from Sortavalsky District
People from Viipuri Province (Grand Duchy of Finland)
Centre Party (Finland) politicians
Members of the Parliament of Finland (1916–17)
Members of the Parliament of Finland (1917–19)
Members of the Parliament of Finland (1919–22)
Members of the Parliament of Finland (1922–24)
Members of the Parliament of Finland (1924–27)
Members of the Parliament of Finland (1927–29)
Members of the Parliament of Finland (1929–30)
People of the Finnish Civil War (White side)